Donald Frederick Lockstead (November 21, 1931 – April 1998) was a plan superintendent and political figure in British Columbia. He represented Mackenzie from 1972 to 1986 as a New Democrat.

He was born in Leduc, Alberta, the son of Daniel Lockstead and Ida Latt. Lockstead was defeated by Harold Long when he ran for reelection to the provincial assembly in 1986. He served as mayor of Powell River, British Columbia.

References 

1931 births
1998 deaths
British Columbia New Democratic Party MLAs
Mayors of places in British Columbia
People from Leduc, Alberta